Count Philip Joseph Kinsky of Wchinitz and Tettau (Czech: Filip Josef Kinský z Vchynic a Tetova; German: Philipp Joseph Graf Kinsky von Wchinitz und Tettau) (28 November 1700 – 12 January 1749) was High chancellor of the Kingdom of Bohemia during the reign of Queen Maria Theresa.

Early life 
Born in Prague as a member of the House of Kinsky, Philip was the son of Count Wenceslaus Kinsky von Wchinitz und Tettau (1642-1719), a Bohemian high chancellor, and his wife, Countess Maria Anna Theresia von Nesselrode-Ereshoven (1670-1716).

Marriage and issue 

On 17 November 1722, he married Countess Marie Karolína Bořitová z Martinic, by whom he had eight children:

Count Franz Karl (1722–1728)
Count Karl Joseph (1723–1724)
Countess Maria Josepha (1724–1754) married Count Michael Johann von Althann (1710-1778)
Franz de Paula Ulrich, Prince Kinsky of Wchinitz and Tettau (1726–1792)
Countess Maria Anna (1727–1733)
Countess Maria Therese (1730–1797) married Count Otto-Philipp von Hohenfeld (1733-1799)
Countess Maria Antonia (1732–1752) married firstly to Count Nikolaus Erdödy (1719-1757); married secondly to Count Kristóf Erdődy (1726-1777)
Count Johann Joseph (1734–1790) married Princess Maria Theresia von Auersperg (1735-1800) and had issue

Career 
Count Kinsky received a fine education and had many interests, such as improving education in Bohemia. He served Emperor Charles VI as an Imperial envoy in London between 1728 and 1736. He came into the cabinet of his successor, Queen Maria Theresa, in 1741, and soon became the Queen's trusted adviser and friend. Many feared him because of his temper. He was thought to be willful, but also stubborn and arrogant, which is why he wasn't very popular.

He was elected a Fellow of the Royal Society of London in 1731.

References

Black, Jeremy: Parliament and foreign policy in the eighteenth century Cambridge University Press 2004 
Duffy, Christopher: The army of Maria Theresa: The Armed Forces of Imperial Austria, 1740-1780 Hippocrene Books 1977 
LeCaine Agnew, Hugh: Origins of the Czech national renascence University of Pittsburgh Press 1993 0822937425
Morris, Constance Lily: Maria Theresa – The Last Conservative READ BOOKS 2007 
Szabo, Franz A.J.: Kaunitz and enlightened absolutism, 1753-1780 Cambridge University Press 1994 

1700 births
1749 deaths
Bohemian nobility
Counts of Germany
Czech politicians
Philip
Fellows of the Royal Society
Ambassadors of Austria to the United Kingdom